The Haviland and Elizabeth Streets–Hanford Place Historic District is an irregularly shaped  historic district in Norwalk, Connecticut that was listed on the National Register of Historic Places in 1988.  It encompasses a neighborhood that developed in the late 19th century following the introduction of railroad service to South Norwalk.

Description and history
The district lies within a primarily commercial area of the South Norwalk neighborhood.
It includes 36 contributing buildings and 2 non-contributing ones.  The district is significant as a cohesive grouping of late 19th and early 20th century residential architecture. Eight houses are Queen Anne style, which involves irregular massing and use of turned or sawn woodwork in porches and elsewhere.  Others display Colonial Revival elements, including Tuscan columns on some.  Some are Italianate or display aspects of that style. Second Empire style is also represented.

Prior to the arrival of the railroad station and depot in South Norwalk in 1870, the area was economically focused on the waterfront, with oyster fishing its primary industry.  The railroad spurred the introduction of factories and industrial production, resulting in the related growth of residential housing and a thriving commercial district.  This historic district encompasses a cross section of residential architecture from this period of growth.

Listed buildings
The buildings included in the district are:
3 Elizabeth Street, Colonial Revival vernacular, c. 1900 (see accompanying photo #6)
5 Elizabeth Street, Queen Anne, c. 1900 (see accompanying photo #6)
7 Elizabeth Street, Queen Anne, c. 1900 (see accompanying photo #6)
8 Elizabeth Street, Italianate, c. 1875, with Colonial Revival entrance porch
9 Elizabeth Street, c. 1870 (see accompanying photo #6)
rear of 9 Elizabeth Street, c. 1920 (see accompanying photo #7)
9 Elizabeth Street, 3 bay fieldstone garage (see accompanying photo #15)
10 Elizabeth Street, Italianate vernacular, c. 1875 with Queen Anne style porch
11 Elizabeth Street, Italianate, c. 1880
12 Elizabeth Street
13 Elizabeth Street
14 Elizabeth Street
15 Elizabeth Street
17 Elizabeth Street, Italianate, c.1885
2 Hanford Place, Queen Anne, c. 1880 (see photos #13 and #19)
3 Hanford Place
4 Hanford Place
5 Hanford Place
6 Hanford Place
7 Hanford Place
8 Hanford Place
9 Hanford Place
10 Hanford Place, Queen Anne, c.1890
11 Hanford Place, Queen Anne, c.1880, includes a barn or carriagehouse (see photo #15)
12 Hanford Place
8 Haviland Street
10 Haviland Street, non-contributing
12 Haviland Street
16 Haviland Street
18 Haviland Street (see photo #4)
20 Haviland Street (see photo #4)
22 Haviland Street (see photo #5)
24 Haviland Street
26 Haviland Street
72 South Main Street (see accompanying photos #3 and #20)
74 South Main Street

See also

National Register of Historic Places listings in Fairfield County, Connecticut

References

National Register of Historic Places in Fairfield County, Connecticut
Second Empire architecture in Connecticut
Queen Anne architecture in Connecticut
Italianate architecture in Connecticut
Historic districts in Fairfield County, Connecticut
Historic districts on the National Register of Historic Places in Connecticut
Norwalk, Connecticut